Zumika Azmi (born 19 June 1998) is a Malaysian cricketer. She made her Women's Twenty20 International (WT20I) debut for Malaysia on 3 June 2018, in the 2018 Women's Twenty20 Asia Cup. She is of Temiar people descent, a group of indigenous in Malaysia. Her younger sister Sasha Azmi also a cricketer for Malaysia.

References

External links
 

1998 births
Living people
Orang Asli
Malaysian women cricketers
Malaysia women Twenty20 International cricketers
Southeast Asian Games medalists in cricket
Southeast Asian Games bronze medalists for Malaysia
Competitors at the 2017 Southeast Asian Games